Synaphea decorticans is a shrub endemic to Western Australia.

It blooms between September and October producing yellow flowers.

It is found on ridges in the Darling Ranges and in the southern Wheatbelt region of Western Australia where it grows in gravelly soils over laterite.

References

External links

Eudicots of Western Australia
decorticans
Endemic flora of Western Australia
Plants described in 1839